Buckley Victoria was a Welsh football club based in Buckley, Wales. Formed around 1890, they played in the FA Cup, Welsh Cup and The Combination.

History
Formed around 1890, they played in the FA Cup, Welsh Cup and The Combination.

League history

Cup history

References

Sources

Defunct football clubs in Wales
West Cheshire Association Football League clubs
Association football clubs disestablished in 1903
Sport in Flintshire